Calanguban is an extinct genus of scincomorph lizard from the Early Cretaceous of South America. The type species Calanguban alamoi was named in 2014 from the Crato Formation of Brazil and is the oldest known non-iguanian lizard from the continent. It likely had an arboreal lifestyle.

References 

Cretaceous lizards
Early Cretaceous reptiles of South America
Cretaceous Brazil
Fossils of Brazil
Crato Formation
Fossil taxa described in 2014